Ajit Kumar Saha was an Indian politician. He was elected to the Lok Sabha, lower house of the Parliament of India from Vishnupur, West Bengal  as member of the Communist Party of India (Marxist) .He was a student of Bankura Christian College

References

1938 births
India MPs 1971–1977
India MPs 1977–1979
India MPs 1980–1984
India MPs 1984–1989
Lok Sabha members from West Bengal
Communist Party of India (Marxist) politicians from West Bengal
Living people
People from Bankura district